Pradhan Mantri Suraksha Bima Yojana (PMSBY, translation: Prime Minister's Safety Insurance Scheme) is a government-backed accident insurance scheme in India. It was originally mentioned in the 2015 Budget speech by Finance Minister Late Arun Jaitley in February 2015. It was formally launched by the Prime Minister Narendra Modi on 8 May in Kolkata.

Provisions
Pradhan Mantri Suraksha Bima Yojana is available to people (Indian Resident or NRI) between 18 and 70 years of age with bank accounts. Goods and Services Tax (GST) is exempted on Pradhan Mantri Suraksha Bima Yojana. The amount is automatically debited from the account. This insurance scheme can have one year cover from 1 June to 31 May and is offered through banks. It is administered through public sector general insurance companies.

In case of death or full disability, the payment to the nominee will be Rs. 200,000 and in case of partial permanent disability Rs. 100,000. Full disability has been defined as loss of use in both eyes, hands, or feet. Partial Permanent disability has been defined as loss of use in one eye, hand, or foot. Further, death due to suicide, alcohol, drug abuse, etc., are not covered. A person joined under this scheme is eligible for a claim only after 45 days of joining the scheme.

This scheme is linked to the bank accounts opened under the Pradhan Mantri Jan Dhan Yojana scheme. Most of these accounts had zero balance initially. The government aims to reduce the number of such zero balance accounts by using this and related schemes. Now, all bank account holders can avail this facility through their net-banking service facility at any time of the year.

Criticism
A rising loss ratio has forced general insurers to urge the government to hike the premium for the scheme.

Results

In April 2017, Haryana Government announced that all Haryana residents in the age group of 18–70 years will be covered by PMSBY; the state government would reimburse the premium to the beneficiary.

See also
 Pradhan Mantri Jan Dhan Yojana
 Pradhan Mantri Jeevan Jyoti Bima Yojana
 Atal Pension Yojana

References

Modi administration initiatives
Government schemes in India
Social security in India
Insurance in India
2015 introductions